Sister Act is a 1992 American comedy film directed by Emile Ardolino and written by Paul Rudnick (as Joseph Howard). It stars Whoopi Goldberg as a lounge singer forced to join a convent after being placed in a witness protection program. It also features Maggie Smith, Kathy Najimy, Wendy Makkena, Mary Wickes, and Harvey Keitel.

Sister Act was one of the most financially successful comedies of the early 1990s, grossing $231 million worldwide against a $31 million budget. The film spawned a franchise, which consists of the 1993 sequel Sister Act 2: Back in the Habit and a musical adaptation, which premiered in 2006. A third film is in development for Disney+.

Plot
In 1968, Deloris Wilson is a young Catholic school student, who is less than serious about her studies, greatly embarrassing her nun teachers.

Twenty-four years later, in 1992, Deloris is a lounge singer in Reno, Nevada, performing as Deloris Van Cartier. After she witnesses her gangster boyfriend Vince LaRocca execute an informant, police lieutenant Eddie Souther places her in witness protection. She is brought to Saint Katherine's Convent in Saint Katherine's Parish, in a run-down neighborhood in San Francisco. Deloris initially objects, then relents.
 
The head nun of St. Katherine's, "Reverend Mother", also objects to taking Deloris in but Monsignor O'Hara, the local parish priest, convinces her to go along with it as the police will pay the failing convent a good sum of money to do so. Disguised as "Sister Mary Clarence", Deloris initially has difficulty dealing with the rigid and simple convent life but befriends the other nuns, (Sister Mary Patrick, the elderly Sister Mary Lazarus and the Novice Sister Mary Robert). One night, after a poorly attended Sunday Mass, with a lackluster performance from the convent choir, led by Mary Lazarus, Deloris sneaks out to a bar, followed by Mary Patrick and Mary Robert. They are caught by the Reverend Mother, who orders Deloris join the struggling choir. With her singing experience, Deloris is elected their director and transforms the choir.

At the next Sunday Mass, Deloris leads the much-improved choir in a traditional hymn, then shifts into a combined Gospel and Rock and Roll interpretation. Although Reverend Mother is infuriated, Monsignor O'Hara congratulates the choir for their unorthodox performance as new people were attracted to the service. Convinced by Deloris, he allows the nuns to clean the church and the neighborhood. Their singing and efforts to revitalize the neighborhood attract media attention, and the parish starts to thrive.

Souther chastises Deloris for nearly being exposed on national television as Vince has placed a bounty on her head. She assures him she will try to keep a lower profile and Souther attends a Mass. The nun's choir continues to amaze parishioners and visitors, especially with a rendition of "My Guy" – rewritten and performed as "My God".

O'Hara informs the convent that Pope John Paul II, having heard of the choir's success, will visit the church. Deloris tells Reverend Mother that Vince's upcoming trial means she will soon leave; the Mother reveals she has resigned as abbess, believing she is no longer useful to the convent as her authority was undermined. Deloris tries to convince her to stay but the Mother retorts that she believes herself too old-fashioned and incapable to continue in office.

Souther discovers a corrupt detective in his own department, who has given Deloris' location to Vince and rushes to San Francisco to warn her. She and Mary Robert are kidnapped by Vince's men but Deloris helps her escape. Afterward, Reverend Mother reveals to the nuns that Sister Mary Clarence is Deloris Van Cartier and explains why she had been hiding in their convent. They decide to rescue Deloris, requesting a helicopter pilot to fly them to Reno.

Vince orders his men to kill Deloris but they cannot bring themselves to shoot her dressed in a nun's habit. Arriving at Vince's casino, the nuns find her after she escapes from Vince's men. They become trapped in the casino lounge and Deloris prepares to sacrifice herself. Vince is hesitant, but prepares to shoot her. His hesitation is just long enough for Souther to shoot Vince in the arm, and to arrest all three.

Thanking Deloris for her actions, Reverend Mother decides to remain as abbess of the convent. Returning to San Francisco, the choir, led by Deloris, sing "I Will Follow Him" to a packed audience in a refurbished Saint Katherine's, receiving a standing ovation from all, including Reverend Mother, the Pope, Monsignor O'Hara, and Souther. Deloris continues to guide and coach the choir as a touring musical group.

Cast

Choir nuns

Production

Screenwriter Paul Rudnick pitched Sister Act to producer Scott Rudin in 1987, with Bette Midler in mind for the lead role. The script was brought to Disney. However, Midler turned down the role, fearing that her fans would not want to see her play a nun. Eventually, Whoopi Goldberg signed on to play the lead. As production commenced, the script was rewritten by a half dozen screenwriters, including Carrie Fisher, Robert Harling, and Nancy Meyers. With the movie no longer resembling his original script, Rudnick asked to be credited with a pseudonym in the film, deciding on Joseph Howard.

The church in which Deloris takes sanctuary is St. Paul's Catholic Church, located at Valley and Church Streets in Noe Valley, an upper-middle-class neighborhood of San Francisco. The storefronts on the opposite side of the street were redressed to give the appearance of a run-down neighborhood.

Though the order of the nuns in the film is said to be a Carmelite one by Sister Mary Patrick, their religious habit is similar in appearance to that of the Sisters of St. Joseph of the Third Order of St. Francis (minus the cross). Members of the real-life Order, however, no longer wear their traditional habit.

Soundtrack
The film's soundtrack was released by Hollywood Records on June 9, 1992, in conjunction with the film, and contained the musical numbers performed by actors in the film itself, pre-recorded songs that were used as part of the background music, and instrumental music composed by Marc Shaiman for the film. The soundtrack album debuted at #74 and eventually reached #40 on the Billboard Top 200 Albums Chart where it charted for 54 weeks. The album received a Gold certification from the RIAA for shipment of 500,000 copies on January 13, 1993. The album was certified platinum in Australia.

 "The Lounge Medley" ("(Love Is Like a) Heat Wave"/"My Guy"/"I Will Follow Him") — Deloris & The Ronelles
 "The Murder" (Instrumental)
 "Getting into the Habit" (Instrumental)
 "Rescue Me" — Fontella Bass
 "Hail Holy Queen" — Deloris & The Sisters
 "Roll With Me Henry" — Etta James
 "Gravy for My Mashed Potatoes" — Dee Dee Sharp
 "My Guy (My God)" — Deloris & The Sisters
 "Just a Touch of Love (Everyday)" — C+C Music Factory
 "Deloris Is Kidnapped" (Instrumental)
 "Nuns to the Rescue" (Instrumental)
 "Finale: I Will Follow Him ('Chariot')" — Deloris & The Sisters
 "Shout" — Deloris & The Sisters & The Ronelles
 "If My Sister's in Trouble" — Lady Soul

 The singing voice for the character of Mary Robert was performed by Andrea Robinson.

Reception
The film received a generally positive reception from critics, holding a 75% rating on Rotten Tomatoes based on 28 reviews. The site's consensus states: "Looking for a sweet musical comedy about a witness to a crime hiding out from killers in a convent? There's nun better than Sister Act." Roger Ebert of the Chicago Sun-Times gave the film 2.5 stars out of a possible 4. He wrote that Goldberg and Wickes both offered humorous performances, but the film overall "plays like a missed opportunity" due to slow pacing and trouble integrating the organized crime scenes into a comedy film. Metacritic gave the film a score of 51 based on the 23 reviews, indicating "mixed or average reviews". Audiences polled by CinemaScore gave the film an average grade of "A" on an A+ to F scale.

Box office
The film was a box-office success, grossing $139.6 million in the U.S. and $92 million in other countries, effectively grossing $231.6 million worldwide, becoming the eighth-highest-grossing film worldwide of 1992. It sat at the #2 spot for four weeks, behind Lethal Weapon 3, Patriot Games,  and Batman Returns in succession.

Awards and nominations

The film is also recognized by American Film Institute in these lists:
 AFI's 100 Years... 100 Laughs — Nominated

Controversy and lawsuits
On June 10, 1993, actress Donna Douglas and her partner Curt Wilson in Associated Artists Entertainment, Inc. filed a $200 million lawsuit against The Walt Disney Company, Whoopi Goldberg, Bette Midler, their production companies, and Creative Artists Agency claiming the film was plagiarized from the book A Nun in the Closet, owned by the partners. Douglas and Wilson argued that, in 1985, they had developed a screenplay for the book, which had been submitted to Disney, Goldberg, and Midler three times during 1987 and 1988. The lawsuit noted over 100 similarities between the movie and the book/screenplay as evidence of plagiarism. In 1994, Douglas and Wilson declined a $1 million offer in an attempt to win the case. The judge found in favor of Disney and the other defendants. Wilson stated at the time, "They would have had to copy our stuff verbatim for us to prevail."

In November 2011, a nun named Delois Blakely filed a lawsuit against The Walt Disney Company and Sony Pictures claiming that The Harlem Street Nun, an autobiography she wrote in 1987, was the basis for the 1992 film. She alleged that a movie executive expressed an interest in the movie rights after she wrote a three-page synopsis. She sued for "breach of contract, misappropriation of likeness and unjust enrichment." Blakely dropped the original lawsuit in January 2012 to serve a more robust lawsuit in late August 2012 with the New York Supreme Court, asking for $1 billion in damages from Disney. In early February 2013, the New York Supreme Court dismissed the lawsuit with prejudice, awarding no damages to Blakely.

Home media
The Region 1 DVD was released on November 6, 2001; however, the disc has no anamorphic enhancement, similar to early DVDs from Buena Vista Home Entertainment. Special Features include the film's theatrical trailer; music videos for "I Will Follow Him" by Deloris and the Sisters, and "If My Sister's in Trouble" by Lady Soul, both of which contain clips from the film; and a featurette titled "Inside Sister Act: The Making Of".

The all-region Blu-ray including both films was released on June 19, 2012, with both films presented in 1080p. The three-disc set also includes both films on DVD with the same bonus features as previous releases.

Musical

The musical Sister Act, directed by Peter Schneider and choreographed by Marguerite Derricks, premiered at the Pasadena Playhouse in Pasadena, California on October 24, 2006, and closed on December 23, 2006. It broke records, grossing $1,085,929 to become the highest grossing show ever at the venue. The production then moved to the Alliance Theatre in Atlanta, Georgia, where it ran from January 17 to February 25, 2007.

The musical then opened in the West End at the London Palladium on June 2, 2009, following previews from May 7. The production was directed by Peter Schneider, produced by Whoopi Goldberg together with the Dutch company Stage Entertainment, and choreographed by Anthony Van Laast, with set design by Klara Zieglerova, costume design by Lez Brotherston and lighting design by Natasha Katz. Following a year-long search, 24-year-old actress Patina Miller was cast as Deloris, alongside Sheila Hancock as the Mother Superior, Ian Lavender as Monsignor Howard, Chris Jarman as Shank, Ako Mitchell as Eddie, Katie Rowley Jones as Sister Mary Robert, Claire Greenway as Sister Mary Patrick and Julia Sutton as Sister Mary Lazarus. The musical received four Laurence Olivier Awards nominations, including Best Musical. On October 30, 2010, the show played its final performance at the London Palladium and transferred to Broadway.

The musical opened at the Broadway Theatre on April 20, 2011, with previews beginning March 24, 2011. Jerry Zaks directed the Broadway production with Douglas Carter Beane rewriting the book. Miller, who originated the role of Deloris in the West End production, reprised her role, making her Broadway debut. She was replaced by Raven-Symoné, also making her Broadway debut. The original Broadway cast featured Victoria Clark (Mother Superior), Fred Applegate (Monsignor), Sarah Bolt (Sister Mary Patrick), Chester Gregory (Eddie), Kingsley Leggs (Curtis), Marla Mindelle (Sister Mary Robert) and Audrie Neenan (Sister Mary Lazarus). The musical received five Tony Award nominations including Best Musical.

The musical closed, in August 2012, after 561 performances.

References

External links

 
 
 
 

1992 films
1990s crime comedy films
1990s musical comedy films
American crime comedy films
American musical comedy films
American children's comedy films
American children's musical films
Cultural depictions of Pope John Paul II
1990s English-language films
Films about Catholic nuns
Films about Christianity
Films about singers
Films adapted into plays
Films directed by Emile Ardolino
Films involved in plagiarism controversies
Films scored by Marc Shaiman
Films set in 1968
Films set in 1992
Films set in Reno, Nevada
Films set in San Francisco
Films shot in Los Angeles
Films shot in Nevada
Films shot in San Francisco
Films with screenplays by Paul Rudnick
Religious comedy films
Touchstone Pictures films
Films about witness protection
1992 comedy films
1990s American films